The rufous-backed stipplethroat (Epinecrophylla haematonota), also called the rufous-backed antwren or the stipple-throated antwren, is a species of bird in the family Thamnophilidae. It is found in southeastern Colombia and southern Venezuela to eastern Ecuador, northern and eastern Peru and western Brazil in its natural habitat of subtropical or tropical moist lowland forests.

Taxonomy
The rufous-backed stipplethroat was described by the English zoologist Philip Sclater in 1857 and given the binomial name Formicivora haematonota. It was formerly placed in the genus Myrmotherula. In 2014, the species name was changed from the nominate subspecies of the rufous-backed stipplethroat when two other former subspecies were reclassified as the Negro stipple-throated antwren and Yasuni antwren, but vocalizations were found to be identical and morphological differences slight (Isler and Whitney 2018), so they were returned to subspecies status.

Description
The male has mainly brown upper parts with a reddish-brown back and rump, and black wing coverts with white speckling and two white bars. The male's throat is black spotted with white, and the sides of the head, the breast and belly are grey. The female is similar to the male but the wing coverts are tipped with buff and the sides of the face and the throat are ochre, the throat sometimes being tinged with red. In both sexes, the colour of the iris is variable and can be orange, dark or whitish, and the tail is brown which distinguishes this species from the rufous-tailed stipplethroat (Epinecrophylla erythrura). The song is a trill of short, staccato notes, first rising in pitch and then descending.

Ecology
The species is often seen in small mixed flocks of passerine birds moving through the forest and foraging in the lower parts of the canopy. The diet consists mainly of insects and spiders, particularly crickets, and is found on shoots and leaves, with the bird often probing into curled, dead foliage.

Conservation status
Epinecrophylla haematonota is a fairly common bird with a wide range. No particular threats are known, and in the absence of contrary information, the population is presumed to be stable and the International Union for Conservation of Nature has rated the conservation status of this bird as being of "least concern".

References

General references
 Isler, M., D. Lacerda, P. Isler, S. Hackett, K. Rosenberg, and R. Brumfield (2006). Epinecrophylla, a new genus of antwrens (Aves: Passeriformes: Thamnophilidae). Proceedings of the Biological Society of Washington 119(4): 522-527

rufous-backed stipplethroat
Birds of the Amazon Basin
Birds of the Colombian Amazon
Birds of the Peruvian Amazon
Birds of the Venezuelan Amazon
rufous-backed stipplethroat
rufous-backed stipplethroat
Taxonomy articles created by Polbot